Vanunan (also Romanized as Vanūnān; also known as Vandan and Wandān) is a village in Soltaniyeh Rural District, Soltaniyeh District, Abhar County, Zanjan Province, Iran. At the 2006 census, its population was 161, in 45 families.

References 

Populated places in Abhar County